Purcy Sergio de Baas (born 2 March 1995) is a Surinamese professional footballer who plays as a centre-back for SVB Eerste Divisie club Leo Victor and the Suriname national team.

International career 
De Baas made his debut for Suriname in a 4–0 win over French Guiana on 18 August 2018.

References

External links 
 
 

1995 births
Living people
Surinamese footballers
Association football defenders
Sportspeople from Paramaribo
S.V. Leo Victor players
SVB Eerste Divisie players
Suriname international footballers